The Moluccan drongo-cuckoo (Surniculus musschenbroeki) is a species of cuckoo. It is found on Sulawesi, Buton, Obira, Bacan and Halmahera islands in Indonesia.

References

Moluccan drongo-cuckoo
Birds of Sulawesi
Birds of the Maluku Islands
Moluccan drongo-cuckoo